Kaipara Harbour is a large enclosed harbour estuary complex on the north western side of the North Island of New Zealand. The northern part of the harbour is administered by the Kaipara District and the southern part is administered by the Auckland Council. The local Māori tribe is Ngāti Whātua.

By area, the Kaipara Harbour is one of the largest harbours in the world.

According to Māori tradition, the name Kaipara had its origins back in the 15th century when the Arawa chief, Kahumatamomoe, travelled to the Kaipara to visit his nephew at Pouto. At a feast, he was so impressed with the cooked root of the para fern, that he gave the name Kai-para to the district. Kaipara comes from the Māori  meaning "food", and   meaning "king fern".

Geography 

Several large arms extend into the interior of the peninsula at the northeast of the harbour, one of them ending near the town of Maungaturoto, only ten kilometres (6 mi) from the Pacific Ocean coast. The harbour has extensive catchments feeding five rivers and over a hundred streams, and includes large estuaries formed by the Wairoa, Otamatea, Oruawharo, Tauhoa (Channel) and Kaipara. A number of small islands off the shoreline are connected to the mainland by mudflats at low tide.

The Kaipara Harbour is broad and mostly shallow, as it is formed from a system of drowned river valleys.

The harbour entrance is a channel to the Tasman Sea. On average, Kaipara tides rise and fall . Spring tidal flows reach 9 km/h (5 knots) in the entrance channel and move 1,990 million cubic metres per tidal movement or 7,960 million cubic metres daily.

The harbour head is a hostile place. Big waves from the Tasman Sea break over large sandbanks about five metres below the surface, two to five kilometres from the shore. The sand in these sandbanks comes mainly from the Waikato River. Sand discharged from this river is transported northward by the prevailing coastal currents. Some of this sand is carried into the Kaipara harbour entrance, but mostly cycles out again and then continues moving northwards along the west coast. The southern sandbanks at the entrance are constantly accumulating and releasing this sand.

These treacherous sandbanks shift and change position, and are known locally as the graveyard. The graveyard is responsible for more shipwrecks than any other place in New Zealand, and has claimed at least 43 vessels—some say as many as 110.

European history 

In 1839, European settlers began arriving in the Kaipara to fell and mill kauri trees and build boats for local requirements. Despite the perilous bar at the harbour entrance, the Kaipara became a busy timber port from the 1860s, shipping thousands of tonnes of kauri timber and gum. The first sailing ship wrecked at the entrance to the harbour was the Aurora in April 1840. The brigantine Sophia Pate was wrecked at South Head in August 1841 with the loss of all 21 on board.

The Wairoa is the main river feeding the Kaipara from the north. Thirty kilometres upstream, the town of Dargaville was established. The stretch of water to Dargaville is broad and straight and provides an easy to navigate route into what were then kauri forests in the interior. Dargaville flourished and immigrants from Britain and Croatia were attracted to the area. Ships up to 3,000 tons carried timber and logs out along the Wairoa to defy the bar at the harbour entrance before continuing on, usually to another New Zealand port or across the Tasman to Australia.

The Kaipara River is the principal river feeding Kaipara Harbour from the south. From 1863 Helensville established itself as a timber port on this river, and provided shipping services about the Kaipara. When the timber ran out, Helensville developed sheep and dairy farms, and more recently nut plantations, vineyards and deer farms.

Further south, Riverhead was an important trading link with the Kaipara and Helensville, and a centre for gum digging. Also set by a river, it milled timber and flour, and made paper. Later it turned to tobacco. From 1929 to 1933, the Riverhead State Forest was developed from 5,000 ha of exhausted gum land.

As the kauri ran out, the Kaipara became a backwater. After 1920 the gum and timber industries dwindled, and farming, mainly dairying, took over. In particular, there is dairying on the rich Ruāwai flats. These flats are below sea level, and are protected by a stopbank and a drainage system. Coastal sawmill settlements at Tinopai, Arapaoa, Batley, Matakohe, Oneriri, Ōruawharo, Pahi, Paparoa, Tanoa and Whakapirau (history photos on the Whakapirau Community Website) have become quiet backwaters. Pahi has become a launch point for houseboats and fishing. Matakohe has a museum which commemorates the kauri industry and the early Pākehā settlers.

Today, Dargaville is the principal centre in the Kaipara area. Its population levelled in the 1960s. It is the country's main kūmara (sweet potato) producer.

Fisheries

Much of the coastal fishing industry in New Zealand depends on mangrove forests. About 80% of fish caught commercially are linked to food chains dependent on the mangroves, and at least 30 species of fish use mangrove wetlands at some stage of their life cycle.

The marine and estuarine areas in the Kaipara Harbour breed snapper, mullet, flounder, sole, kahawai, white trevally, gurnard, yellow‑eyed mullet and skates, rays and sharks. The Kaipara is the largest estuarine harbour on the west coast of New Zealand and provides significant areas of suitable breeding grounds and habitats for juvenile fish. It has fewer problems with water quality than the Manukau, and is the single most significant wetland for west coast fisheries.

In 2009, NIWA scientists discovered that 98 percent of snapper on the west coast of the North Island were originally juveniles from nurseries in the Kaipara. Snapper is New Zealand's largest recreational fishery, and is also a commercial fishery with an annual export value of $32 million. The findings show how fragile some fish stocks can be, and highlights the importance of protecting natural habitats, like the Kaipara.

Native rock oysters are plentiful on the rocky shores, and the introduced Pacific oysters flourish lower in the intertidal zone. There are cockles and tuatua on the lower tidal flats, mussels from low tide on the rocks to subtidal beds closer to the mouth of the harbour, and scallops in the tidal channels.

The scallop population has periodic incidences of high mortality, the causes of which have not been identified. Concerns in recent years about the size and availability of scallops have resulted in temporary closures of the scallop fisheries.

Early versions of oyster farming occurred between the early 1900s and 1950s. Thousands of tons of rocks were placed along the shorelines to act as an additional substrate on which the natural rock oyster could grow. In 2002, the Crown settled the historical claims of Te Uri o Hau, a hapu of the northern Kaipara Harbour. As part of the settlement, access to and the rights of the hapu to gather oysters within the existing "Maori Oyster Areas" were recognised. In 2008, resource consent was given to Biomarine to establish New Zealand's largest oyster farm in the Kaipara. The farm is projected to produce about NZ$30 million in annual exports and 100 new jobs.

In recent years, there has been a perception amongst locals that commercial fishers have damaged fisheries in the Kaipara. Locals have been frustrated in their attempts to gain government support. The veteran filmmaker Barry Barclay has examined this in his 2005 documentary, The Kaipara affair.

Sand mining

Currently (2007) about 219,000 cubic metres of sand is mined each year from the entrance and tidal deltas of the Kaipara. This sand contributes over half the sand requirements for Auckland. The sand is used in the production of concrete and asphalt, and also in drainage systems and beach nourishment. A suction pump is usually used to extract the sand from the seabed. It is pumped into a barge as a sand and water slurry. As the barge loads, shells and other objects are screened out and the sea water drained back to the sea. The availability of sea sand within the Auckland region means the road costs of transporting sand from further parts of the country are avoided. Concerns about possible negative consequences of this sand mining have also been raised.

Tidal power

In 2008, Crest Energy, a power company, received resource consent to install about 200 underwater tidal turbines in the Kaipara Harbour, which would use the substantial tidal flows moving in and out every day near the harbour mouth to produce electricity for approximately 250,000 homes.

Crest plans to place the turbines at least 30 metres deep along a ten kilometre stretch of the main channel. Historical charts show this stretch of the channel has changed little over 150 years. The output of the turbines will cycle twice daily with the predictable rise and fall of the tide. Each turbine will have a maximum output of 1.2 MW, and is expected to generate 0.75 MW averaged over time.

The peak level of generation for the combined turbines is about 200 MW. This exceeds the projected peak electricity needs of Northland. It would have environmental benefits in offsetting annual carbon emissions from a thermal-based, gas turbine generator of 575,000 tonnes of carbon. The project is costed at about $600 million and to be economic would have to be scaled up rapidly to near full capacity.

However, while the Department of Conservation has approved the project, and has made substantial environmental monitoring conditions part of the consent, the project also has objectors on the grounds of claimed influences on the local ecosystems and charter fishing (see the section above on fisheries). Appeals before the Environment Court are still likely.

Management issues
Management of the Kaipara Harbour does not have a central administration. Management is distributed among the Kaipara District Council, Auckland Council, Northland Regional Council, the Department of Conservation's Northland and Auckland section, and the Ministry of Fisheries.

The Ministry of Fishing allocates quota for the north west region of New Zealand as a whole, but does not tailor quota specifically for the Kaipara. Local iwi feel they are not sufficiently involved in management issues, and to further compound matters, the local iwi is split between Te Uri-o-Hau in the northern part and Te Taoū in the southern part.

Environmental issues 
As of 2011, the environmental state of the harbour has been called as "nearing crisis" and "in significant decline", with shrinking fish and shellfish stocks, more sedimentation, declining water quality and competition for resource use and development being noted as the main issues, with "ninety-nine per cent of the rivers in the catchment [are] polluted".

As part of the worldwide trend, there is a decline in biodiversity within the Kaipara. The timber industry removed most of the native forest. Much of the kauri and kahikatea forest, and scrub and riparian vegetation, has been replaced with farm and urban areas. Mangrove forests and wetlands have been "reclaimed". Soil erosion has increased on the land and sedimentation in the harbour. Shellfish abundance has declined, especially toheroa, scallops, tuatua, cockles and pipi. Finfish like mullet, snapper, kanae and school shark have diminished.

Habitat fragmentation has also occurred. Natural vegetation in the Kaipara catchments have been reduced to islands of wetlands and forest in man-made landscapes—separated by urban areas, roads, exotic forests and pastures. More information is needed on biodiversity in the Kaipara Harbour and habitats in associated coastal areas. A recent pilot survey found that habitats in the estuaries are still extensive, but ninety percent of land cover is no longer indigenous wetland or vegetation. Even if the key existing areas were to be protected, further buffers and corridors that give better connection between the natural areas would be needed to encourage the recovery of biodiversity.

Timeline
 

 c. 1300: The Maori chief Rongomai arrives in his canoe Māhuhu from Hawaiki, and is drowned at the harbour entrance.
 1807 or 1808: Ngapuhi fight Ngāti Whātua, Te-Uri-o-Hau and Te Roroa iwi at the battle of Moremonui on the west coast of Northland, the first battle in which Maori used muskets.
 1839: European settlers begin arriving to fell and mill kauri trees.
 1840: The Aurora, a 550-ton barque, is the first European ship to be wrecked at the entrance.
 1860s: The timber industry is established.
 1899: The timber industry peaks.
 c. 1939: Timber trade ends, and the area becomes a backwater.
 2002: Crown settles historical claims of Te Uri o Hau
 2005: Filmmaker Barry Barclay makes his documentary, The Kaipara Affair.
 2008: Biomarine receives resource consent to establish an oyster farm
 2008: Crest Energy receives resource consent to install tidal turbines

See also
 Aotearoa Wave and Tidal Energy Association
 Pouto Peninsula
 Alan Gibbs - Gibbs Farm

References

Further reading
 Diggle, E and Diggle, KGL (2007 8th ed) New Zealand Shipwrecks: Over 200 Years of Disasters at Sea. Hachette Livre. 
 Haggit T, Mead S and M Bellingham (2008) Review of Environmental Information on the Kaipara Harbour ARC Technical Publication TP 354 (9 parts).
 Kaipara Harbour
 Paulin CD and Paul LJ (2006) "The Kaipara mullet fishery: nineteenth-century management issues revisited" Tuhinga, 17: 1–26.
 Scott, Dick (1988) Seven Lives on Salt River. Hodder & Stoughton/Southern Cross.  (explores seven early families who lived on the shores of the Pahi and Arapāoa rivers).

External links
 Integrated Kaipara Harbour Management Group
Kaipara Moana Remediation Programme
 Te Tiaki Mahinga Kai – coalition of Māori environmental guardians supporting the management of customary fishing areas.
 Kaipara lighthouse 1884, NZ

Geography of the Auckland Region
Geography of the Northland Region
Kaipara District
Ports and harbours of New Zealand
Rodney Local Board Area